The Johnstown Mill Rats are a collegiate summer baseball team based in Johnstown, Pennsylvania. They are a member of the East Conference of the summer collegiate Prospect League. The Mill Rats were founded in 2020 and began play at Point Stadium in 2021.

Season-by-season record

Roster

References

External links 

2020 establishments in Pennsylvania
Amateur baseball teams in Pennsylvania
Baseball teams established in 2020
Johnstown, Pennsylvania
Prospect League teams